Robert Douglas "Rob" Nicholson  (born April 29, 1952) is a Canadian politician who represented the riding of Niagara Falls in the House of Commons of Canada from 2004 to 2019 as a member of the Conservative Party. Under Prime Minister Stephen Harper, he served as Minister of National Defence, Minister of Justice, Minister of Foreign Affairs, and Leader of the Government in the House of Commons. When the Harper Government ended, he was appointed Justice Critic in the Official Opposition shadow cabinet.

Early life 
Nicholson was born in Niagara Falls, Ontario. He received a Bachelor of Arts degree from Queen's University and a law degree from the University of Windsor. Nicholson practised law before entering politics, and is a member of the Law Society of Ontario.

Political career

First terms in the House of Commons (1984–1993) 
Nicholson was first elected to federal parliament in the federal election of 1984 as a Progressive Conservative, defeating New Democrat Richard Harrington and incumbent Liberal Al MacBain. He was re-elected by a narrower margin in the 1988 election, defeating Liberal Gary Pillitteri by fewer than 2,000 votes.

During the 33rd Canadian Parliament, he served on the standing committees responsible for justice (vice-chairman), foreign affairs, national defence and transport.  Nicholson also served on the special committee on child care.

During the 34th Canadian Parliament, he continued to serve on the justice committee and was also named a parliamentary secretary, supporting the Government House Leader (1989-1990) and the Attorney General of Canada (1989-1993) in Prime Minister of Canada Brian Mulroney's government.

Following Kim Campbell's appointment as prime minister, Nicholson joined the cabinet as Minister for Science and Minister responsible for Small Business.

As with all of his caucus colleagues, save for Jean Charest and Elsie Wayne, he was defeated in the 1993 election, finishing third behind Pillitteri and Mel Grunstein of the Reform Party.

Municipal politics 
Nicholson was elected as a trustee for the Niagara Catholic District School Board in 1994. He was elected to the Niagara Regional Council later in 1997, and was re-elected in 2000, and 2003. He ran for Chairman of the Regional Municipality of Niagara in late 2003, but lost to St. Catharines Regional Councillor Peter Partington.

He attempted to regain his old Commons seat in the 1997 election, but again finished third. He did not seek election to the Commons in the 2000 election.

Return to Opposition in 38th Parliament 
The Progressive Conservatives merged with the Canadian Alliance as the Conservative Party of Canada in early 2004, and Nicholson joined the new party. He was narrowly returned to parliament in the 2004 election, defeating Liberal Victor Pietrangelo by more than 1,000 votes.

Nicholson served as Shadow Transportation Critic from July 2004 to January 2005. He was appointed Chief Opposition Whip on January 28, 2005.

During the 38th Canadian Parliament, he was one of only two members of the 99-member Conservative caucus in the Commons who had previously served in the federal cabinet.

Harper government (2005-2015) 

Nicholson was re-elected in the 2006 election and appointed to the Harper cabinet as Government House Leader.

Minister of Justice (2007-2013)
Nicholson was appointed as Minister of Justice and Attorney General of Canada in early 2007. He replaced Vic Toews as Justice Minister during a Cabinet shuffle on January 4, 2007. Peter Van Loan replaced Nicholson as Government House Leader.

On March 13, 2010, Nicholson released the terms of reference for the appointment of Frank Iacobucci as an Independent Adviser. Iacobucci will conduct an independent review of documents related to the transfer of detainees by the Canadian Forces in Afghanistan.

This statement comes after Richard Colvin spoke before a parliamentary committee stating that he warned for a full year that detainees Canadian troops handed over to Afghan forces faced torture before the government began to monitor them.  “London, The Hague and Canberra [Australia] are deeply concerned about the absence of solid legal protections for detainees, which – in the age of Gitmo and Abu Ghraib – imperils domestic support for the Afghanistan mission,” said the memo of December 4, 2006, written by diplomat Richard Colvin. Amir Attaran also brought forward testimony in stark contrast to then Canadian Ambassador to Afghanistan David Sproule's. Afgan prisoners testified that after capture by Canadians, they were subsequently handed to the custody of the Afghan National Army (ANA), claiming they were later been abused by the ANA.

Minister of Defence (2013-2015)
In the July 15, 2013 cabinet shuffle, Nicholson switched portfolios with Peter Mackay and became the Minister of Defence.

Minister of Foreign Affairs (2015)
Because of John Baird's resignation, Harper was forced to reshuffle his Ministry on 9 February 2015. An unexpected beneficiary of the Baird defalcation was Nicholson, who was promoted to Minister of Foreign Affairs (Canada). Nicholson's time as head of the Canadian Foreign Service was cut short when he was ejected from office on 4 November 2015 due to the Duffygate as Harper lost the 2015 election.

Back in opposition (2015-2019)

While the Conservatives were relegated to the Official Opposition after the 2015 election, Nicholson was re-elected and announced his intention to run for the interim leadership of the party.  He was defeated by Rona Ambrose, and was subsequently named as the Conservative Justice Critic.

Nicholson did not run for re-election in the 2019 federal election.

Election results 

 					

Note: Conservative vote is compared to the total of the Canadian Alliance vote and Progressive Conservative vote in 2000 election.

See also 
List of Knights of Columbus

References

External links 

|-

1952 births
Attorneys General of Canada
Canadian Ministers of Foreign Affairs
Canadian lawyers
Canadian Roman Catholics
Conservative Party of Canada MPs
Defence ministers of Canada
Lawyers in Ontario
Living people
Members of the House of Commons of Canada from Ontario
Members of the King's Privy Council for Canada
People from Niagara Falls, Ontario
Queen's University at Kingston alumni
University of Windsor alumni
Members of the 25th Canadian Ministry
Members of the 28th Canadian Ministry
University of Windsor Faculty of Law alumni